The Sunni Triangle is a densely populated region of Iraq to the north and west of Baghdad inhabited mostly by Sunni Muslim Arabs. The roughly triangular area's points are usually said to lie near Baghdad (the southeast point), Ramadi (the southwest point) and Tikrit (the north point). Each side is approximately 125 kilometers (80 miles) long. The area also contains the cities of Samarra, Fallujah, Balad and Hīt.

The area was a center of strong support for former Iraqi president Saddam Hussein's government; from the 1970s on, many government workers, politicians, and military leaders came from the area. Saddam was born just outside Tikrit. After the 2003 U.S. invasion of Iraq, the area became a focus of armed Sunni opposition to Coalition Provisional Authority rule.

The term "Sunni triangle" was used intermittently from the 1970s among academic Iraq specialists, usually to differentiate it from Iraqi Kurdistan in the north and the Shia regions to the south. An early use in mainstream media is a San Francisco Chronicle article of September 14, 2002 in which former United Nations weapons inspector Scott Ritter says: "We may be able to generate support for an invasion among some of the Shiites and some of the Kurds, but to get to Baghdad you must penetrate the Sunni Triangle." However, it didn't come into widespread use until a New York Times article of June 10, 2003 popularized the term in a report on "a new U.S. effort to quell nascent armed resistance in Sunni Muslim-dominated areas north and west of Baghdad [in an] area known as the 'Sunni triangle'." It became commonplace in reports on the US-led Multi-National Force – Iraq's efforts to control the region.

The lack of economic diversity within the region is a deterrent to Sunni separatism in Iraq as most of the oil reserves are in Kurdish and Shia regions, and the port cities of Basra and Umm Qasr are far away from the triangle.

The "Sunni Triangle" is distinct from the Triangle of Death, a similarly Sunni area south of Baghdad which saw major combat activity in late 2004.
Western Asia

References

See also 
 Operation Red Dawn
 Operation Vigilant Resolve
 Operation Phantom Fury

Politics of Iraq
Geography of Iraq
Iraqi insurgency (2003–2011)
Iraq War